Cynthia Quartey (born 3 November 1965) is a Ghanaian former athlete who specialized in sprinting.

She represented her country at the 1984 Summer Olympics in Los Angeles, where she participated in the 4 x 100 meter relay winning a medal.

References 

Living people
Athletes (track and field) at the 1984 Summer Olympics
1963 births
Ghanaian female sprinters
Olympic athletes of Ghana
Olympic female sprinters
Ghanaian sportspeople